2 Guitars is an album by guitarists Kenny Burrell and Jimmy Raney recorded in 1957 and released on the Prestige label.

Reception

Allmusic awarded the album 3 stars with Scott Yanow stating: "This is a well-rounded set that may not contain any real surprises, but will be enjoyed by collectors of hard bop".

Track listing 
All compositions by Mal Waldron except where noted.
 "Blue Duke" – 8:50
 "Dead Heat" – 4:07
 "Pivot" – 5:13
 "I'll Close My Eyes" (Buddy Kaye, Billy Reid) – 4:50
 "Little Melonae" (Jackie McLean) – 9:29
 "This Way" (Doug Watkins) – 12:25
 "Out of Nowhere" (Johnny Green, Edward Heyman) – 4:31

Personnel 
Kenny Burrell – guitar (tracks 1-6; KB with just rhythm section on 4)
Jimmy Raney – guitar (tracks 1-3, 5-7; JR with just rhythm section on 7)
Donald Byrd – trumpet (tracks 1-3, 5 & 6)
Jackie McLean – alto saxophone (tracks 1-3, 5 & 6)
Mal Waldron – piano 
Doug Watkins – bass
Art Taylor – drums

References 

Kenny Burrell albums
Jimmy Raney albums
1957 albums
Albums recorded at Van Gelder Studio
Prestige Records albums
Instrumental albums
Albums produced by Teddy Charles